Gay Blades is a 1946 American comedy film directed by George Blair and written by Albert Beich and Marcy Klauber. The film stars Allan Lane, Jean Rogers, Edward Ashley, Frank Albertson, Ann Gillis and Robert Armstrong. The film was released on January 25, 1946, by Republic Pictures.

Plot
Hollywood talent scout Nancy Davis is told by her boss, J.M. Snively, to go find an unknown to become a new hero and star in "The Behemoth," his next big production. Nancy is just about out of ideas when she finds herself in Duluth, Minnesota impressed by the Rustlers' hockey star, Andy Buell.

They discuss the idea at a party at the home of Helen Dowell and her husband, Frankie, who is Andy's friend and teammate on the ice. Andy actually wants to become an architect when he is finished with hockey. He is coaxed into giving Snively's movie a try, but is attracted to Nancy, becomes distracted, his play suffers and the Rustlers begin losing, causing Andy to be jeered by the team's fans.

Things continue to go wrong. Andy loses his future job with the architectural firm. His temper flares, he gets drunk and jailed, then takes out his aggression on the ice, where Frankie is seriously hurt. Snively hears the crowd boo and rescinds the offer and fires Nancy on the spot. Before the next game, Andy gives a blood transfusion to Frankie at the hospital. He shows up in the third period, leads the Rustlers to victory and is able to get his architect job back after all.

Cast 
  
Allan Lane as Andy Buell
Jean Rogers as Nancy Davis
Edward Ashley as Ted Brinker
Frank Albertson as Frankie Dowell
Ann Gillis as Helen Dowell
Robert Armstrong as McManus
Paul Harvey as J.M. Snively
Ray Walker as Bill Calhoun
Jonathan Hale as Whittlesey
Russell Hicks as Buxton
Emmett Vogan as Doctor
Edward Gargan as Bartender
Nedrick Young as Gary Lester

References

External links 
 

1946 films
American comedy films
1946 comedy films
Republic Pictures films
Films directed by George Blair
American black-and-white films
1940s English-language films
1940s American films